James Lloyd Patton (June 21, 1941), is an American evolutionary biologist and mammalogist. He is emeritus professor of integrative biology and curator of mammals at the Museum of Vertebrate Zoology, UC Berkeley and has made extensive contributions to the systematics and biogeography of several vertebrate taxa, especially small mammals (rodents, marsupials, and bats).

Career
Patton is best known for his pioneering works on the evolutionary cytogenetics and systematics of rodents, especially pocket mice (Perognathus/Chaetodipus) and pocket gophers (Thomomys), the diversification of rainforest faunas, and the impact of climate change on North American mammals. He has authored nearly 200 scientific publications, many of them in collaboration with 36 graduate students and 13 post-doctoral scholars he mentored over four decades. He is one of the most experienced field mammalogists today, having collected extensively in the western United States and in 14 other countries around the world, including Mexico, Ecuador (Galapagos Islands), Peru, Venezuela, Argentina, Brazil, Colombia, Taiwan, Vietnam, Iran, and Cameroon. As of 2005, he had deposited nearly 20,000 specimens in the Museum of Vertebrate Zoology, making him the most prolific collector of mammal specimens in that institution’s nearly 100-year history.

Honors
Patton has several taxa named in his honor: two genera of neotropical rats (Pattonomys  and Pattonimus ), three species of neotropical rodents (Proechimys pattoni, Phyllomys pattoni, and the fossil Ullumys pattoni), one species of fossil porcupine (Neosteiromys pattoni), one species of neotropical bat (Lonchophylla pattoni), one species of pocket gopher louse (Geomydoecus pattoni), and one species of Madagascar snake (Liophidium pattoni).

The American Society of Mammalogists established the "James L. Patton Award" in 2015 to promote and support museum-based research by graduate students.

Selected publications
 
 
 Moritz, C., J.L. Patton, C.J. Schneider, and T.B. Smith. 2000. Diversification of rainforest faunas: An integrated molecular approach. Annu. Rev. Ecol. Syst. 31: 533-563.

References

External links
 James L. Patton Award, American Society of Mammalogists: James L. Patton Award | American Society of Mammalogists
 Museum of Vertebrate Zoology, Mammal Collection: MVZ | Mammal Collection
 The Grinnell Resurvey Project: Grinnell Resurvey Project
 The Patton Lab: The Patton Lab at UC Berkeley
 Faces of Berkeley: Jim Patton, adventuring professor: Faces of Berkeley: Jim Patton, adventuring professor
 Nature News: The ambitious effort to document California’s changing deserts: The ambitious effort to document California’s changing deserts

1941 births
American geneticists
American mammalogists
American naturalists
21st-century American zoologists
University of Arizona alumni
University of California, Berkeley faculty
Scientists from the San Francisco Bay Area
Living people